The 1964 Camden Council election took place on 7 May 1964 to elect members of Camden London Borough Council in London, England. The whole council was up for election and the Labour party gained control of the council.

Background
These elections were the first to the newly formed borough. Previously elections had taken place in the Metropolitan Borough of Hampstead, Metropolitan Borough of Holborn and Metropolitan Borough of St Pancras. These boroughs were joined to form the new London Borough of Camden by the London Government Act 1963.

A total of 169 candidates stood in the election for the 60 seats being contested across 19 wards. These included a full slate from the Conservative and Labour parties, while the Liberals stood 31 candidates. Other candidates included 14 from the Communist party, 2 Independents and 2 Independent Labour. There were 10 three-seat wards, 6 four-seat wards and 3 two-seat wards.

This election had aldermen as well as directly elected councillors.  Labour got 8 aldermen and the Conservatives 2.

The Council was elected in 1964 as a "shadow authority" but did not start operations until 1 April 1965.

Election result
The results saw Labour gain the new council with a majority of 8 after winning 34 of the 60 seats. Overall turnout in the election was 35.6%. This turnout included 1,347 postal votes.

Ward results

Adelaide

Belsize

Bloomsbury

Camden

Chalk Farm

Euston

Gospel Oak

Grafton

Hampstead Central

Hampstead Town

Highgate

Holborn

Kilburn

King's Cross

Priory

Regent's Park

St John's

St Pancras

West End

References

1964
1964 London Borough council elections